Coleophora irinella is a moth of the family Coleophoridae. It is found in the Russian Far East.

References

irinella
Moths described in 1999
Moths of Asia